Herschel Mack "Boog" Powell IV (born January 14, 1993) is an American professional baseball outfielder who is currently a free agent. He has played in Major League Baseball (MLB) for the Seattle Mariners and Oakland Athletics.

Career
Powell attended Mission Viejo High School in Mission Viejo, California, and Orange Coast College.

Oakland Athletics
The Oakland Athletics selected Powell in the 20th round of the 2012 Major League Baseball draft. He made his professional debut that season with the Arizona League Athletics. in 2013 he played for the Vermont Lake Monsters. Powell started 2014 with the Beloit Snappers. In June he was named the MVP of the Midwest League All-Star Game. He was later promoted to the Stockton Ports. In July, Powell was suspended 50 games after testing positive for an amphetamine.

Tampa Bay Rays
On January 10, 2015, the Athletics traded Powell, John Jaso, and Daniel Robertson to the Tampa Bay Rays for Ben Zobrist and Yunel Escobar. He attended major league spring training in 2015.

Seattle Mariners
On November 5, 2015, the Rays traded Powell, Nate Karns, and C. J. Riefenhauser to the Seattle Mariners for Brad Miller, Logan Morrison, and Danny Farquhar. The Mariners added him to their 40-man roster after the season. On June 23, 2016, Powell accepted an 80-game suspension for a second positive test for banned substances. The Mariners promoted him to the  major leagues on April 29, 2017, and he made his major league debut against the Cleveland Indians on that day.

Oakland Athletics (second stint)
On August 6, 2017, the Mariners traded him back to the Oakland Athletics for Yonder Alonso. He was sent outright to Triple-A on September 1, 2018. He became a free agent after the 2018 season.

San Diego Padres
On January 24, 2019, Powell signed a minor league deal with the San Diego Padres. He became a free agent following the 2019 season.

Cincinnati Reds
On January 10, 2020, Powell signed a minor league deal with the Cincinnati Reds. On September 7, 2020, Powell was released by the Reds.

Gastonia Honey Hunters
On March 23, 2021, Powell signed with the Gastonia Honey Hunters of the Atlantic League of Professional Baseball. Powell played in 100 games for Gastonia, hitting .342/.440/.539 with 10 home runs and 52 RBI's.

Long Island Ducks
On October 9, 2021, Powell was traded to the Long Island Ducks. Powell collected 3 hits in 8 at-bats across 2 contests for the Ducks. He became a free agent following the season.

Lexington Legends
On April 4, 2022, Powell signed with the Lexington Legends of the Atlantic League of Professional Baseball. He was released on September 1, 2022.

Personal life
Powell is nicknamed "Boog" after the former Baltimore Orioles first baseman and 1970 AL MVP Boog Powell, with whom he shares no relation. His father gave him the nickname as a child in order to avoid confusion, since Powell shares a name with his father, grandfather and great-grandfather.

References

External links

1993 births
Living people
Sportspeople from Irvine, California
Baseball players from California
Major League Baseball outfielders
Seattle Mariners players
Oakland Athletics players
Arizona League Athletics players
Vermont Lake Monsters players
Beloit Snappers players
Stockton Ports players
Mesa Solar Sox players
Montgomery Biscuits players
Durham Bulls players
Tacoma Rainiers players
Águilas Cibaeñas players
American expatriate baseball players in the Dominican Republic
Nashville Sounds players
El Paso Chihuahuas players
Estrellas Orientales players
Gastonia Honey Hunters players
Long Island Ducks players